The 2022 PSA Women's World Squash Championship is the 2022 women's edition of the World Squash Championships, which served as the individual world championship for squash players. The event takes place in Cairo, Egypt from 13 to 22 May 2022. It will be the third time that Cairo host the PSA World Championships after 2014 and 2019–20 editions.

World Ranking Points/Prize money
PSA also awards points towards World Ranking. Points are awarded as follows:

Prize money breakdown
Total prize money for the tournament is $1,100,000, $550,000 per gender. This is about a 9% prize fund increase from previous World Championships (2020–21; 500,000$ per gender).

Seeds

  Nouran Gohar (finals)
  Nour El Sherbini  (champion) 
  Hania El Hammamy (quarter finals)
  Amanda Sobhy (semi finals)
  Joelle King (third round)
  Sarah-Jane Perry (quarter finals)
  Salma Hany (second round)
  Rowan Elaraby (quarter finals)

  Georgina Kennedy (third round)
  Olivia Fiechter (second round)
  Nele Gilis (third round)
  Joshna Chinappa (third round)
  Tesni Evans (third round)
  Nadine Shahin (second round)
  Nada Abbas (quarter finals)
  Hollie Naughton (second round)

Draw and results

Key
 rtd. = Retired
 Q = Qualifier
 WC = Host wild card
 I =  invitee
 w/o = Walkover

Finals

Top half

Section 1

Section 2

Bottom half

Section 3

Section 4

Schedule
Times are Egypt Standard Time (UTC+02:00). To the best of five games.

Round 1

——————————————————————————————————————————————————————————————————————————————————————————————————————————

Round 2

Round 3

Quarter-finals

Semi-finals

Final

Representation
This table shows the number of players by country in the 2022 PSA Women's World Championship. A total of 19 nationalities are represented. Egypt is the most represented nation with 18 players.

See also
 World Squash Championships
 2022 PSA Men's World Squash Championship

References

World Squash Championships
Men's World Squash Championship
Squash tournaments in Egypt
International sports competitions hosted by Egypt
PSA Men's World Squash Championship
PSA